The 2017 Kildare Senior Football Championship is the 124th edition of the Kildare GAA's premier club Gaelic football tournament for senior graded teams in County Kildare, Ireland. The tournament consists of 16 teams with the winner going on to represent Kildare in the Leinster Senior Club Football Championship. The championship has a back-door format for the first two rounds before proceeding to a knock-out format. Generally, any team to lose two matches will be knocked out of the championship.

Sarsfields were the defending champions after they defeated town rivals Moorefield in the previous years final, however their Newbridge town rivals exacted their revenge when dethroning them at the quarter-final stage. 

This was the Round Tower's return to the senior grade after 4 years in the middle grade.

Allenwood were relegated to the 2018 I.F.C. after losing to Eadestown in the Relegation Final, and thus ending their 27 year stay in the top-flight of Kildare club football.

Team Changes

The following teams have changed division since the 2016 championship season.

To S.F.C.
Promoted from 2016 Kildare Intermediate Football Championship
 Round Towers  -  (Intermediate Champions)

From S.F.C.
Relegated to 2017 Kildare Intermediate Football Championship
 Monasterevin

Round 1
All 16 teams enter the competition in this round. The 8 winners progress to Round 2A while the 8 losers progress to Round 2B.

Round 2

Round 2A
The 8 winners from Round 1 enter this round. The 4 winners will enter the draw for the quarter finals while the 4 losers will play in Round 3.

Round 2B
The 8 losers from Round 1 enter this round. The 4 winners will go into the Round 3 while the 4 losers will enter the Relegation Playoffs.

Round 3
The 4 losers from Round 2A enter this round and they play the 4 winners from Round 2B. The 4 winners will go into the draw for the quarter-finals.

Quarter-finals

Semi-finals

Final

Relegation playoff

Relegation Semi-Finals

 St. Laurence's 2-13, 1-9 Allenwood, Hawkfield, 14/9/2017,
 Maynooth 1-8, 0-9 Eadestown, Hawkfield, 14/9/2017,

Relegation Final

 Eadestown 3-12, 1-13 Allenwood, Hawkfield, 24/9/2017,

Leinster Senior Club Football Championship

References

Kildare Senior Football Championship
Kildare Senior Football Championship